Mount Meager may refer to:
 Mount Meager massif, a group of mountains in British Columbia, Canada
 Mount Meager (British Columbia), a mountain of the above massif

See also
Meager (disambiguation)